We're Not Gonna Take It may refer to:

 "We're Not Gonna Take It" (Twisted Sister song)
 "We're Not Gonna Take It" (The Who song), a song by The Who that includes the single "See Me, Feel Me" from Tommy
 "We're Not Gonna Take It" (That '70s Show), an episode of the TV series That '70s Show

See also
 "Ain't Gonna Take It", a 1978 song by the Tom Robinson Band